The Scarboro Landfill is a controversial landfill in Harford County, Maryland in the United States. It is located on the property of the Harford Waste Disposal Center operated by the Harford County Government where a separate sanitary landfill is in use. An assessment of the landfills was carried out and confirmed the concerns raised by local residents.

The now closed Scarboro Landfill is unlined, and it received municipal waste from 1956 until 1986. In the 1980s a number of wells had been drilled in the areas surrounding the landfill and were discovered to contain pollutants such as methylene chloride, toluene, ethylbenzene and other xylenes. A remediation program is being carried out and there is a recognised problem with volatile organic compounds.

The Scarboro Conservation Area is nearby.

See also
Landfills in the United States
Environment of the United States
Waste in the United States

References

External links
Harford Waste Disposal Center at the Harford County Government

Landfills in the United States
Buildings and structures in Harford County, Maryland
Environment of Maryland